George Davidsohn (born January 20, 1936 in Montevideo, died October 16, 2015 in New York City) was the founder of Davidsohn Computer Services / BTSI and Davidsohn Global Technologies.

Early life and career
Davidsohn was born in Montevideo to a Jewish family originating from Transylvania; when he was ten, the family moved to New York City where his father worked as a diplomatic consul. At 14, Davidsohn started his career on Wall Street as an IBM punched-card clerk, while attending high school at night. He attended Brooklyn College and the New York Institute of Finance.

George Davidsohn & Son, Inc.
In 1956, Davidsohn left Dean Witter and founded Davidsohn Computer Services.

In 1973, Davidsohn himself left Control Data and formed The Davidsohn Group, a subsidiary of George Davidsohn & Son, Inc. As of January 2009, George Davidsohn & Son, Inc. is now Davidsohn Global Technologies and his son, Joseph has taken over as President and CEO.

Personal life
George Davidsohn attended the American Academy of Dramatic Arts and took part in several Off-Broadway productions. He was also an avid baseball fan and had a tryout, as a shortstop, for the Brooklyn Dodgers. He and his wife, Denise, had 6 children.

References

Businesspeople from New York (state)
Uruguayan people of Romanian-Jewish descent
Uruguayan Jews
Uruguayan emigrants to the United States
American people of Romanian-Jewish descent
Living people
1936 births
Brooklyn College alumni